Loginov and Loginova (feminine) is a Russian surname. Notable people with the surname include:

Andrey Loginov (born 1972), Soviet middle distance runner
Anton Loginov  (born Mikhail Osipovich Loginov, 1882-1963), Russian Bolshevik Revolutionary, Communist Party Member, Journalist, Writer, Soviet publicist, propagandist of atheism.
Alexandr Loginov, Russian biathlete
Anna Loginova (1978–2008), Russian fashion model and bodyguard
Galina Loginova, Soviet actress, mother of American model, actress Milla Jovovich
Mikhail Loginov (1903–1940), Soviet weapon designer
Svyatoslav Loginov, Russian science fiction writer
Valery Loginov (born 1955), Russian and Uzbekistani chess grandmaster
Vyacheslav Loginov (born 1979), Russian politician

See also
Loginovo
Loginova (village), a village in Tyumen Oblast, Russia

Russian-language surnames